Valley Pride Freedom Fighters are a Belizean football team based in Dangriga. They are current member of the Premier League of Belize of the Football Federation of Belize.

History

The club was founded as Freedom Fighters and in 2015 changed to King Energy/Freedom Fighters . In the Winter 2011/2012 was rebranded as Paradise/Freedom Fighters FC, before the club changed its name to Freedom Fighters in January 2015.

Stadium
Their home stadium is Victor Sanchez Union Field, Punta Gorda.

Current squad

Notes

External links
Paradise/Freedom Fighters

Football clubs in Belize
Toledo District
Association football clubs established in 2008
2008 establishments in Belize